Sacred Stone is the second book in The Oregon Files series of novels by best-selling author Clive Cussler and Craig Dirgo. It was released on October 5, 2004 by Berkley.

As with the rest of the series, the main character Juan Cabrillo is the captain of the Oregon, an ultramodern warship disguised as a decrepit tramp steamer, and with a crew made up of ex-military and intelligence operatives.

Plot

Within the story are the separate plots that ultimately turn out to be connected to each other. One is the job of supplying security for the emir of Qatar, at a conference in Iceland. The second is to find a missing nuclear bomb.  The Oregon's crew also has to pick up a radioactive iridium meteorite recently found in a mysterious ancient shrine, designed by Erik the Red and constructed by his crew. The Stone also holds primordial matter from another world, an oxygen eating microbe.

There are also two different bands of fanatics. One is an Islamist group that wants to use the Stone to build a dirty bomb to wipe out London. The other, an anti-Islamist, plans to swap the Stone with the Black Stone (referred to as Abraham's Stone) and smash it on the Dome of the Rock.

Cultural references

There is also a restaurant in the small Victorian coastal town of Hunstanton, Norfolk, England called The Honeystone, which is referred to by locals as "The Sacred Stone".

References 

The Oregon Files
2004 American novels
American thriller novels
Novels by Clive Cussler
Collaborative novels